Hungary uses the FM band for commercial and public broadcasting, plus the AM band for the main state radio station and state-run ethnic programs. There are three types of licences defined in the media law: public service, commercial and community, although they do not necessarily correspond to the everyday meanings of these terms.

Types of radio stations defined by the Hungarian media authority are as follows: public service, national commercial, regional, local, small community.

Internet-only stations are not included in this list (except the state-run parliamentary channel).

Active radio stations
Data in this page are from the National Authority database cited above.

References